Valencia is the only genus in the family Valenciidae. Valencia is a genus of ray-finned fishes. It is sometimes grouped into the family Cyprinodontidae. Members of this genus are restricted to southern Europe.

Species 
There are currently three recognized species in this genus:
 Valencia hispanica (Valenciennes, 1846) (Valencia toothcarp)
 Valencia letourneuxi (Sauvage, 1880) (Corfu toothcarp)
 Valencia robertae Freyhof, Kärst & Geiger, 2014

References

External links

 
Freshwater fish genera
Taxa named by George S. Myers